"Valley of the Shadow" is a 51-minute episode of the American television anthology series The Twilight Zone. In this episode, a reporter is held captive in a small town after he discovers its incredible secret.

Opening narration

Plot
Reporter Philip Redfield gets lost while driving with his dog, Rollie, on unfamiliar back roads, and stops in Peaceful Valley, New Mexico, seeking food, directions, and gasoline. The gas station attendant fills his tank but is curt and claims the only restaurant in town is closed. Rollie leaps out of the car to chase a little girl's cat up a tree. The girl uses a strange device to make the dog disappear. When Philip confronts the girl's father, he pretends to go looking for Rollie, then secretly uses the device to make the dog re-materialize.

Philip and his dog seek food at the town's hotel. Ellen, the proprietor, is as curt as the gas station attendant and insists they have no rooms available even though the keys to all the rooms are still on display at the check-in desk. Philip's suspicions are fully aroused by this time, but questioning Ellen about the residents' strange behavior gets him nowhere. He drives out of town only to run into an invisible wall which totals his car and kills Rollie. A band of Peaceful Valley residents are waiting at the scene and take him to the town elders while another resident brings Rollie back to life.

The town elders question Philip on why he came to Peaceful Valley and whether anyone knows where he is. They show him some of the technology they have, including a replicator which can produce any object given its molecular formula and a ray which can reverse any injury, including death. The elders refuse to share this technology, given to the town 104 years earlier by a scientist from an unknown planet, until "men learn the ways of peace." Philip rebukes them for decreeing themselves the sole people capable of using these extraterrestrial gifts responsibly, and for squandering technology that could be used to cure all illness and end hunger. The town elders insist that if they shared the technology it would be used for weapons, and tell Philip that due to his chance witnessing of the device used to make his dog disappear, he must either stay forever in Peaceful Valley or be executed to preserve the town's secrets.

Philip is now a prisoner in his new home, with an invisible wall placed to keep him from venturing beyond the yard. He becomes romantically involved with Ellen, and tries to make her realize her own lack of freedom, knowing that the town elders will not let any of Peaceful Valley's residents leave for fear they would reveal the town's secrets. Seemingly persuaded that he cannot reciprocate her love unless she sets him free, Ellen disables the invisible wall and offers to drive Phillip out of town. He arms himself by replicating a revolver and steals a book containing the equations that explain the town's technology, but sets off an alarm in the process. When the three town elders attempt to prevent his escape, he shoots them.

Once Philip and Ellen are outside the town limits, she shows him that the book is blank, then uses a device to de-materialize him. Ellen was a plant, Philip's entire escape a test. The elders, revived by the technology, claim his decision to create and use a gun confirms their belief that the people of Peaceful Valley are the only ones fit to use the alien technology. Ellen confesses her involvement was not entirely a deception, implying that her feelings for him were real. The elders "execute" Philip by rendering him unconscious, erasing his memories of Peaceful Valley, and returning him and his car to the gas station. When he wakes up, the attendant has just finished filling his tank. He asks for directions and drives out of town, experiencing a moment of déjà vu when he sees Ellen, who has tears in her eyes.

Note: As were several Twilight Zone episodes of that Cold War period, this episode was another thinly-veiled allegory of the freedom/communism dichotomy, as it portrayed Peaceful Valley as a utopian but inescapable paradise, pitted against the protagonist who wanted the freedom he could not have there.

Closing narration

Production
This is one of many Twilight Zone episodes that re-used props from MGM's 1956 film  Forbidden Planet. In this case the matter-transporting "dissemblers" used by the Peaceful Valley inhabitants originated as the C57-D crew communicators in Forbidden Planet.

Precursors
The episode includes what are effectively mini-transporters (disassembling people's atoms and reassembling them elsewhere), replicators (creating a meal, for instance, out of a printed pattern) and a force field. Several characters use a device which could equally well be a communicator or a cell phone — all three years before the original Star Trek. James Doohan plays a minor role in the episode.

The overall premise of a hidden civilization hiding futuristic technology until the world becomes peaceful also foreshadows Marvel's Black Panther comic book series (1966) by three years.

The premise of a man held captive in a small town and expected to assimilate was expanded on in The Prisoner.

Cast
Ed Nelson as Philip Redfield
Natalie Trundy as Ellen Marshall
David Opatoshu as Dorn
Dabbs Greer as Evans
Jacques Aubuchon as Connelly
James Doohan as Johnson (role listed as "Father" in credits)
Morgan Brittany (as Suzanne Cupito) as Cissie Johnson (role listed as "Girl" in credits)
Sandy Kenyon as Fredericks (role listed as "The Attendant" in credits)
Henry Beckman as Townsperson
Bart Burns as Townsperson
King Calder as Townsperson
Pat O'Hara as Townsperson

References

 DeVoe, Bill. (2008). Trivia from The Twilight Zone. Albany, GA: Bear Manor Media.
 Grams, Martin. (2008). The Twilight Zone: Unlocking the Door to a Television Classic. Churchville, MD: OTR Publishing.

External links
 

The Twilight Zone (1959 TV series season 4) episodes
1963 American television episodes
Television episodes set in New Mexico
Television shows written by Charles Beaumont